Lee Benoit (born 1959) is an American Cajun musician from Rayne, Louisiana.

Early life

At the age of five, Benoit was given an electric organ by his grandmother (Cidalise), who raised him. He started to play Christmas songs on it, by ear.

At the age of twelve, he started to play the electric guitar and formed a band. They played rock n' roll and were influenced by Lynyrd Skynyrd, Creedence Clearwater Revival, Hank Williams and others. Benoit also learnt to play the bass guitar during his teenage years.

In 1976, he joined the Marines as an Automated Data Processor. After leaving the Marines in 1979, he returned to education. In 1985, he became a nationally registered paramedic. He worked as a paramedic on an ambulance for seven years and then for another seven years on an oil platform. He continued to play rock and country music in his spare time.

Inspiration and first recording

At the age of 29, he was inspired to take up the accordion by hearing the Cajun performer Wayne Toups. Benoit fell in love with the instrument and playing Cajun music. He soon added Cajun songs to his set lists.

In 1993, he signed to the Master-Trak label and in 1994 recorded his first CD (Avec Amis).: The album was nominated for "Best First Album" and "Valerie" was nominated for "Song of the Year" by the Cajun French Music Association.

Performances, recordings and recognition

After the success of his first album, he continued to record his own albums as well as contributing to several CDs by other musicians. In 1995, he recorded  on Hadley J. Castille's "La Musique De Les Castilles". He also played on Hadley's "Forty Acres and Two Mules" album in 2000.

He recorded with the group Les Amies Louisianaises on their La Musique Unique des Acadiens CD in 1997.

Benoit played accordion and guitar on Doug Kershaw's "Two Step Fever" CD in 1999. He also co-produced and played guitar on Hunter Hayes "Through My Eyes" CD in 1999 and co-produced Hunter's second CD, "Make A Wish", in 2001.

In 2002, he played accordion on Don Haynie & Sheryl Samuel's songs God Bless Louisiana and Country Tavern on Saturday Night.

In 1998, he released his second album, "Live at Vermilionville" which was nominated in five categories by the Cajun French Music Association.: "Male Vocalist Of The Year", "Accordionist Of The Year", "Album Of The Year", "Band Of The Year" and "Song Of The Year". He won the latter award, for "The Visit", co-written by Richard D. Meaux and Freddie Pate, at the ceremony on August 13, 1999.

In September 2000, Benoit released his third CD, "Dis N Dat".

In 2001, he was awarded "Accordionist Of The Year" and in 2002 earned the "Presidents Award" from the Cajun French Music Association.

Benoit recorded and mixed his fourth CD, "Ma Petite Femme" at his home and it was released in 2005. This album cemented his reputation, with Benoit winning "Male Vocalist Of The Year", "Accordionist Of The Year" and "Song Of The Year" (with the title song "Ma Petite Femme") from the Cajun French Music Association.: Benoit also received nominations for "Best Recording Of The Year" and "Peoples Choice 2006". On August 19, 2011, Benoit was the recipient of the Heritage Award at the Le Cajun Awards Show by the Cajun French Music Association for outstanding contributions and dedication to the preservation of the Cajun culture.

On August 16, 2013, Benoit was the recipient of the Award Of Excellence at the Le Cajun Awards Show by the Cajun French Music Association.: for being a musician's musician. A musician that other musicians try to emulate. This award is for his overwhelming talent in his craft.

On April 30, 2014, Benoit released his all original Cajun album titled "Pour Les Générations À Venir" (For The Generations To Come). This album was nominated in five categories with the Cajun French Music Association.: for 2015. "Best Album Of The Year", the song "Le Garsoleil" was nominated for "Song Of The Year, "The People's Choice Award", and the group was nominated for "Band Of The Year". Benoit won the "Male Vocalist Of The Year" award at "The Le Cajun Award Show" on August 21, 2015.

Benoit was inducted into The Cajun Music Hall Of Fame on August 15, 2014.:

On April 30, 2018, Benoit released his 6th CD titled "Louisiana Cajun Style". It contains covers of Country songs about Louisiana that he recorded in a Cajun style.

In 2019, Benoit retired from playing and recording music due to a severe back disability.

Discography
Avec Amis (1994)
Live At Vermilionville (1998)
Dis 'N' Dat (2000)
Ma Petite Femme (2005)
Pour Les Générations À Venir (2014)
Louisiana Cajun Style (2018)

See also
Cajun French Music Association
History of Cajun music
List of people related to Cajun music

References

External links

1959 births
Living people
Folk musicians from Louisiana
Musicians from Louisiana
Cajun musicians
People from Rayne, Louisiana
People from Abbeville, Louisiana